Shennan Road is a major east-west thoroughfare of Shenzhen, China.

Location

Spanning all over Luohu, Futian and Nanshan Districts, the road measures  in length. It is divided into three sections, namely Shennan Boulevard, Shennan Middle Roadand Shennan East Road. The sections defined as the portions of Nantou Checkpoint to Huanggang Road, Huanggang Road to Hongling Road and Hongling to Yanhe Road respectively. The two-way road mostly consists of 4 lanes of traffic on each side (around 135m in width, the widest section for up to 350m). In some sections there are side roads and greening present.

History

The road is named after the two former settlements (of which both would later be integrated as part of the city of Shenzhen) it links on each end, the towns of Shenzhen in Luohu and Nantou in Nanshan, and is known for its presence of skyscrapers flanking along its sides. The road was then laid with asphalt, continued by numerous extensions and widenings, and became fully built c.1994.

Attractions
Attractions along the road include Window of the World, Happy Valley, Huaqiangbei, Dongmen and Shun Hing Square.

Gallery

See also
Binhai Boulevard
Beihuan Boulevard

References

Transport in Shenzhen
Futian District
Luohu District
Nanshan District, Shenzhen
Roads in China
Roads in Shenzhen